The Congressional Hispanic Conference (CHC) is a Republican sponsored caucus in the United States Congress. Currently with eleven members, the CHC was formed in 2003, with the stated goal of promoting policy outcomes of importance to Americans of Hispanic or Lusitanic descent. These priorities included support of the following: President George W. Bush and American troops in the war against terrorism; the Free Trade Agreement of the Americas (FTAA); tax relief to families and the over two million Hispanic- and Lusitanic-owned small businesses; support for faith based initiatives; and, educational choice for all. The impetus behind the Conference's creation was the debate surrounding the nomination of conservative lawyer Miguel Estrada to the DC Circuit Court of Appeals and ideological differences in the Congressional Hispanic Caucus, which was predominantly populated by Democratic members of Congress.

History
In the mid to late 1990s, the Republican members of the Congressional Hispanic Caucus – Mexican-American Henry Bonilla of Texas and Cuban-Americans Ileana Ros-Lehtinen and Lincoln Díaz-Balart of Florida – left the Caucus in protest over its support for improved relations with Cuba. While Ros-Lehtinen remained an active member of the CHC's public outreach arm, the Congressional Hispanic Caucus Institute, the Caucus has since been composed solely of Democratic and Democratic-caucusing independent legislators.

Feeling there was "significant need" for a "new Hispanic conference" newly elected Florida congressman Mario Díaz-Balart began to organize in 2002 a caucus for Hispanic Republicans to counter what they felt was Democratic dominance over Hispanic political affairs. On March 17, 2003, Díaz-Balart revealed the formation of the Conference in an open letter published in The Wall Street Journal. Joined by Bonilla, Ros-Lehtinen, his brother Lincoln, and newly elected colleague Devin Nunes, a California congressman of Portuguese (Azorean) descent, Díaz-Balart decried what he perceived as Hispanic Democratic efforts to derail the nomination of Estrada, a selection seen by some at the time as a possible fast track to the U.S. Supreme Court. The group was officially announced at a press conference two days later. They were soon joined by two more Portuguese American congressmen, Richard Pombo of California and Patrick Toomey of Pennsylvania.

Like their Democratic counterpart, the Conference allows members from the Senate. Mel Martinez, the first Cuban-American US Senator, joined the group shortly after his election in 2004. Additionally, the Conference is open to non-Hispanic "associate" members who represent districts with significant Hispanic populations or generally support its goals with regards to public policy. In 2003, Conference members also formed the Congressional Hispanic Leadership Institute as an equivalent to the Democratic CHC-affiliated CHCI.

In the 2006 and 2008 elections, the Conference suffered the loss of nearly half of their members to electoral defeat, attempts at higher office or resignations. Past chair Luis Fortuño left Congress after being elected Governor of Puerto Rico. After the 2010 midterm elections, six new Hispanic Republicans were elected to Congress: Senator Marco Rubio of Florida, Representatives David Rivera of Florida, Raúl Labrador of Idaho, Francisco Canseco and Bill Flores of Texas, and Jaime Herrera Beutler of Washington, as well as Portuguese American Senator Pat Toomey of Pennsylvania, who was a member of the conference when he served in the House.

Membership

Officers 
 Chair: Rep. Mario Díaz-Balart (FL-25)
 Vice Chair:  Rep. Tony Gonzales (TX-23)

Other members
 Sen. Marco Rubio of Florida
 Sen. Ted Cruz of Texas
 Del. Amata Coleman Radewagen (American Samoa at-large)
 Del. Jenniffer González (Resident Commissioner of Puerto Rico)
 Del. James Moylan (Guam at-large)
 Rep. Brian Mast (FL-18)
 Rep. Alex Mooney (WV-2)
 Rep. Mike Garcia (CA-25)
 Rep. Maria Elvira Salazar (FL-27)
 Rep. Carlos Gimenez (FL-26)
 Rep. Nicole Malliotakis (NY-11)
 Rep. David Valadao (CA-21)
 Rep. Lori Chavez-DeRemer (OR-5)
 Rep. Juan Ciscomani (AZ-6)
 Rep. Monica De La Cruz (TX-15)
 Rep. John Duarte (CA-13)
 Rep. Anthony D'Esposito (NY-4)
 Rep. Anna Paulina Luna (FL-13)

Chairs
 2003–2007: Rep. Ileana Ros-Lehtinen
 2007–2009: Res. Comm. Luis Fortuño
 2009–present: Rep. Mario Díaz-Balart
 2023–present: Rep. Tony Gonzales

Former members
 Rep. Devin Nunes
 Rep. Henry Bonilla
 Rep. Lincoln Díaz-Balart
 Rep. Ileana Ros-Lehtinen
 Rep. Richard Pombo
 Sen. Ben Nighthorse Campbell
 Sen. John E. Sununu
 Sen. Mel Martinez
 Sen. Pat Toomey
 Rep. Quico Canseco
 Rep. Bill Flores
 Rep. Jaime Herrera Beutler
 Rep. David Rivera
 Rep. Raúl Labrador
 Rep. Carlos Curbelo
 Rep. Anthony Gonzalez
 Rep. Mayra Flores

See also

List of Hispanic and Latino Americans in the United States Congress
Congressional Hispanic Caucus
 Congressional caucus
 Hispanic and Latino conservatism in the United States

References

External links
Congressional Hispanic Conference

Hispanic
 Congressional Hispanic Conference
Republican Party (United States) organizations
Issue-based groups of legislators